Zachenberg is a municipality in the district of Regen in Bavaria in Germany. It is home to the Buswartehobel, a plane-shaped bus stop shelter.

References

Regen (district)